Baruq Rural District is in the Central District of Baruq County, West Azerbaijan province, Iran. At the National Census of 2006, its population was 11,530 in 2,553 households, when it was in Baruq District of Miandoab County. There were 12,024 inhabitants in 3,378 households at the following census of 2011. At the most recent census of 2016, the population of the rural district was 11,575 in 3,429 households. The largest of its 22 villages was Gol Soleymanabad, with 3,436 people. After the census, Baruq District was separated from Miandoab County, elevated to the status of a county, and divided into two districts.

References 

Rural Districts of West Azerbaijan Province

Populated places in West Azerbaijan Province